Parcheh Qeshlaq may refer to:
 Parcheh Qeshlaq (38°26′ N 47°23′ E), Ahar
 Parcheh Qeshlaq (38°29′ N 47°24′ E), Ahar